Dr. David N. Sundwall is a primary care physician and served as the executive director of the Utah Department of Health from January 2005 to January 2011.

Background
He was born and raised in Murray, Utah, and followed several family members into the medical profession, including his father, Dr. Val Sundwall, great uncles Dr. Olaf Sundwall and Dr. John Sundwall, and brother, Dr. Peter Sundwall.

Government Service
After 23 years of working in various government and private sector health positions in Washington, D.C., he returned to Utah to lead the Utah Department of Health (UDOH). His nomination to serve as the Executive Director of the UDOH by Governor Jon Huntsman, Jr., was confirmed by the Utah State Senate on January 17, 2005.  Sundwall had been called to Washington earlier to work as director of the health staff of the U.S. Senate Labor and Human Resources Committee when Orrin Hatch assumed the chairmanship, after 1981.  Hatch assembled an expert and powerful staff to work on health issues that included Sundwall, future FDA Commissioner David Aaron Kessler, future Surgeon General Antonia Novello, and lobbyist Nancy Taylor.  Even during the Reagan administration, the group was a hotbed of activity on organ transplantation, orphan drugs, food safety, tobacco safety and regulation, health professional training, cancer research and a variety of other issues.  With the assistance of Dr. Ronald Preston, who would later be Massachusetts Secretary of Health and Human Services under Gov. [Mitt Romney], the group pushed the science of health effects of ionizing radiation, in a series of hearings and bills working to repair or compensate Americans, chiefly in Utah, who were injured from fallout from atomic bomb tests conducted at the Nevada Test Site, and during uranium mining and refining operations.

Sundwall continued to serve as UDOH under Gov. Gary Herbert, who succeeded Huntsman when Huntsman was appointed Ambassador to China in 2009.  Sundwall resigned as director in January 2011.

Medical and Public Health Career
Dr. Sundwall earned his medical degree at the University of Utah College of Medicine and completed further training at the Harvard Family Medicine Residency Program. He remains on the faculty of the University of Utah School of Medicine as Associate Professor in the Department of Family and Preventive Medicine. Through his career he has maintained his clinical connection to patients. For the past 17 years he volunteered a half day each week at the HealthCare for Homeless Project, a public clinic near the U.S. Capitol in Washington, D.C.

Dr. Sundwall has been recognized for his professional achievements and contributions to healthcare policy and advocacy. Dr. Sundwall was most recently President of the American Clinical Laboratory Association (from 1994 to 2003) and subsequently Senior Medical and Scientific Officer. He holds three medical school faculty appointments, including Clinical Associate Professor, Department of Community and Family Medicine, Georgetown University College of Medicine, Washington, D.C.

He has held numerous positions in the public health sector: from 1988 to 1994, he was Vice President and Medical Director of American Healthcare Systems, an alliance of not-for-profit multi-hospital systems. Prior to that appointment, he was Administrator in the Health Resources and Services Administration.

Dr. Sundwall has served as an advisor, task force member and chairman of numerous committees involved with public health policy and quality including those connected with the Centers for Disease Control and Prevention and the Food and Drug Administration. In addition, his federal experience included serving as the Assistant Surgeon General in the Commissioned Corps of the U.S. Public Health Service. During this period, he had adjunct responsibilities at the Department of Health and Human Services (HHS) including: Co-Chairman of the HHS Secretary's Task Force on Medical Liability and Malpractice, and was the HHS Secretary's Designee to the National Commission to Prevent Infant Mortality.

Dr. Sundwall is an author or coauthor of numerous publications in peer-reviewed medical literature. He has also contributed chapters to many books covering a broad spectrum of healthcare issues. He is licensed to practice medicine in the District of Columbia and Utah, and is a member of the American Medical Association (AMA) and the American Academy of Family Physicians (AAFP). He is on the board of Trustees at Spelman College in Atlanta, GA.

References

 https://web.archive.org/web/20110217222427/https://health.utah.gov/uthealthnews/2011/20110104-Sundwall.html

Living people
University of Utah alumni
People from Murray, Utah
University of Utah School of Medicine alumni
University of Utah faculty
Georgetown University Medical Center faculty
Year of birth missing (living people)
Physicians from Utah
Harvard Medical School people